Meldal dialect or Meldal Norwegian is a dialect of Norwegian used in Meldal. It is a variety of Trøndersk.

Phonology

Vowels
  is a syllabic, palatalized dental approximant . This is realization is also found in some dialects of Swedish.
This is the case in a large part of Sør-Trøndelag in general.

References

Bibliography

External links
 www.meldal.no - Dialekt

Norwegian dialects
Meldal